Jose De Jesus (born August 12, 1963 in Cayey, Puerto Rico) is a retired professional boxer in the light flyweight (108 lb) division.

Pro career
Nicknamed "Cagüitas", De Jesus became the first WBO light flyweight champion on May 19, 1989. He defended this title three times, but was stripped of it in March 1992 for failure to defend.

See also
List of Puerto Rican boxing world champions
List of light-flyweight boxing champions

External links
 

1963 births
Living people
Light-flyweight boxers
World light-flyweight boxing champions
World Boxing Organization champions
People from Cayey, Puerto Rico
Puerto Rican male boxers